Diesen is a surname. Notable people with the surname include:

Deborah Diesen, American children's book author
Einar Diesen (1897–1994), Norwegian journalist and newspaper editor
Emil Diesen (1880–1942), Norwegian civil servant and editor
Erik Diesen (1922–1999), Norwegian revue writer and radio and television personality
Erling Diesen (born 1932), Norwegian engineer and civil servant
Ernst Diesen (1913–1970), Norwegian actor and theatre director
Henry Diesen (1883–1953), Norwegian naval officer
Kari Diesen (1914–1987), Norwegian singer and revue actress
Mark Diesen (1957–2008), American chess player
Sverre Diesen (born 1949), Norwegian military officer
Thorstein Diesen (1862–1925), Norwegian barrister, newspaper editor and politician
Trygve Allister Diesen (born 1967), Norwegian director, producer, and screenwriter